The Main Building of Vassar College is the oldest surviving building on its campus in Poughkeepsie, New York, and the center of academic life. It was built by James Renwick, Jr. in the Second Empire style in 1861, the second building in the history of what was one of America's first women's colleges.  It is one of the earliest, largest, and most important examples of Second Empire architecture in the United States and is a National Historic Landmark for its architecture and educational significance. At the time of its completion, the structure contained the most interior space of any building in the United States, and housed the entire college, including dormitories, libraries, classrooms, and dining halls. Currently, the first and second floors house campus administration while the remaining three (including the second floor wings) house student rooms.

Architecture
Vassar's Main Building is a large brick building, four stories in height, with a fifth floor under its mansard roof. At the center of the central portion is a projecting pavilion topped by a slate-roofed dome with iron cresting. Most windows are sash, set in openings with either segmented-arch or round-arch tops; the roof is pierced by dormers whose rounded tops have keystones. Window trim and horizontal banding on the building are of bluestone.

The building has in significant part been restored to its original appearance.  One notable exception is a large turning staircase in the central section, which was removed in 1893 as part of a library expansion that became known as "Uncle Fred's Nose", after Fred Thompson, whose name adorned the annex that was added at that time.  That annex was removed in 1959 during the restoration process, but the stairs were not rebuilt.

History
It was taken over by protesters in 1969  and again in 1990.

It was named a National Historic Landmark in 1986. The Vassar Observatory, the first building built on the Vassar campus, is also a National Historic Landmark.

See also
List of National Historic Landmarks in New York
National Register of Historic Places listings in Poughkeepsie, New York

References

External links

 Main Building (1865), at Vassar Encyclopedia
 Vassar College panoramic tour — Select Residential from the righthand column, then Main House, or Bell Ringing, Retreat in the College Center, and Rose Parlor from the Student Life tab.

National Historic Landmarks in New York (state)
School buildings completed in 1861
Vassar College buildings
University and college administration buildings in the United States
James Renwick Jr. buildings
Second Empire architecture in New York (state)
University and college buildings on the National Register of Historic Places in New York (state)
1861 establishments in New York (state)
National Register of Historic Places in Dutchess County, New York